As one of the most iconic and recognizable structures in the world, the Eiffel Tower, completed in 1889, has been the inspiration for the creation of over 50 similar towers around the world. Most are not exact replicas, though there are many that resemble it closely, while others look slightly different. The Eiffel Tower has also inspired other towers that are not close resembling replicas and therefore not listed here, for example the Blackpool Tower.

Replicas of known height
Other Eiffel-inspired towers are listed in the table in descending order of scale and height, imperial measurements rounded to the nearest foot:

Replicas of unknown height 
 Centerpiece of the Falconcity of Wonders - a planned new development project in Dubai, UAE, featuring seven modern wonders of the world (planned).   (approximate coordinates)
 Model in the First World Plaza shopping mall in Genting Highlands, Malaysia
 Satteldorf near Crailsheim, Germany. On the top of a company building 
 Apach, France, on the border with Germany and near the border with Luxembourg 
 Da Lat, Vietnam. Designed to be used as Viettel telecommunications tower
 Model next to the Napa County, California Superior Courthouse in Napa, California, USA, built in France. 
 Sainshand, Mongolia. Painted pink, in the town center . 
Culiacán, Sinaloa, Mexico, Paris motel, on the road from Culiacán to Guamuchil 
 Eiffel Tower in Beijing World Park, near 
 An estimated  replica existed for a few weeks in Santa Clara, Cuba in 1895.
 The Chinese Army trains on a smaller replica at Zhurire.
 Lake Rawa Pening, Indonesia. A bamboo replica situated at the end of a  bamboo path on the lake.  
 Gettysburg, Pennsylvania, in the Devonshire Apartment Complex, which occupies the site of the former International Village tourist attraction.

Image gallery 
These replicas are of unknown height.

See also:

See also
Lattice tower

References

Lists of replicas